The Department of Munitions and Supply was the Canadian federal government ministry responsible for co-ordinating domestic industry during World War II. It was created by the Department of Munitions and Supply Act with C.D. Howe as its Minister. The Department produced armaments for the war effort and regulated the use of gasoline, silk and other strategic commodities in Canada order to prioritize their use for the war production.

Controllers  all of whom were members of the Wartime Industries Control Board  were appointed to regulate the war supply of key industrial sectors, including:

 timber,
 steel,
 other base metals,
 machine tools,
 oil, and
 power.

By the end of the war, Canada's war production ranked fourth among the Allies. By 1945, 70% of Canada's war production went to supply the Allies and only 30% was needed for Canada's own military. Among the production was 815,729 military vehicles, including 45,710 armoured vehicles, many of which went to the British Eighth Army in North Africa and Italy.

The Department established 28 crown corporations including Polymer Corporation that developed and produced synthetic rubber, Victory Aircraft for the production of bombers and Research Enterprises. It coordinated all purchases made in Canada by British and other Allied governments for materials including military transport vehicles, tanks, cargo and military ships, aircraft, guns and small arms, ammunition as well as uniforms, minesweeping equipment, parachutes, firefighting equipment, and hospital supplies.

The Department was dissolved at the conclusion of World War II and most of its crown corporations sold off. The remaining duties of the department were merged with those of the Department of Reconstruction to create the Department of Reconstruction and Supply. In 1951, a new Department of Defence Production was created, with Howe as its minister until 1957. The department itself existed until 1969 when it was abolished and replaced by the Department of Supply and Services.

Further reading

See also
Imperial Munitions Board

References

External links
 
 

Military history of Canada during World War II
Military logistics of Canada
Former Canadian federal departments and agencies